Secret Hate was a punk rock band based in Long Beach, California, which initially contributed two tracks to the Hell Comes to Your House compilation in 1981, as well as an EP, Vegetables Dancing on the now-defunct New Alliance Records.  "The Ballad of Johnny Butt", the fourth track on Vegetables Dancing, was covered by Sublime for their eponymous major label debut in 1996.  Secret Hate broke up shortly afterward, but reformed in the late 1990s in order to release a full-length LP entitled Pop Cult Vomit, which was released on Cornerstone R.A.S., a subsidiary of Skunk Records.

Discography
Vegetables Dancing (1983)
Pop Cult Vomit (2000)

External links
Official Cornerstone R.A.S. Webpage
Band History and Full Discography

New Alliance Records artists
Punk rock groups from California
Culture of Long Beach, California